Journal of Veterinary Medicine may refer to several publications:
Journal of Veterinary Medicine (Hindawi journal) a journal published by Hindawi
Journal of Veterinary Medicine, Series A, originally known as Zentralblatt für Veterinärmedizin Reihe A, now known as  Transboundary and Emerging Diseases, published by Wiley
Journal of Veterinary Medicine, Series B, originally known as Zentralblatt für Veterinärmedizin Reihe B, now known as  Zoonoses and Public Health, published by Wiley
Journal of Veterinary Medicine, Series C, originally known as Zentralblatt für Veterinärmedizin Reihe C, now known as  Anatomia, Histologia, Embryologia, published by Wiley